Inside Dish with Rachael Ray, hosted by Rachael Ray was a hybrid cooking/talk show on the Food Network. In each episode Ray chats with a celebrity as they cook or eat at a restaurant.  Inside Dish is the third of Ray's four shows on Food Network, and premiered on November 5, 2004. It is no longer in production.

List of celebrity guests 
 Dennis Franz
 Morgan Freeman
 Tony Danza
 Cheech Marin
 Mariel Hemingway
 Brett Ratner
 Mekhi Phifer
 Jill Hennessy
 Raven-Symoné
 Gloria Estefan
 Aisha Tyler
 Adam Carolla
 Joe Perry
 Daisy Fuentes
 Penn & Teller
 Rick Nielsen
 Mario Cantone

External links
 

2004 American television series debuts
2005 American television series endings
2000s American cooking television series
Food Network original programming